The 1989–90 Iraq FA Cup was the 13th edition of the Iraq FA Cup as a clubs-only competition. The tournament was won by Al-Zawraa for the sixth time, beating Al-Shabab 2–1 on penalties in the final after a 0–0 draw. The first three rounds were between teams from the lower divisions, before the top-flight clubs began to enter at the round of 32.

Bracket

First preliminary round

Second preliminary round 
The first legs were played on 16 October 1989, and the second legs were played on 30 October 1989.

Third preliminary round 
The first legs were played on 6 November 1989, and the second legs were played on 20 November 1989.

Final phase

Matches

Final

References

External links
 Iraqi Football Website

Iraq FA Cup
Cup